Nono is a rural parish in the municipality of Quito in the Province of Pichincha, Ecuador.

References

External links

Populated places in Pichincha Province
Parishes of Quito Canton